Nectomys apicalis, also known as the western Amazonian nectomys, is a semiaquatic species of rodent in the genus Nectomys of family Cricetidae. It is found east of the Andes in Ecuador, Peru, and Bolivia, east into western Brazil; further to the east, it is replaced by N. rattus. It lives near watercourses in lowland tropical rainforest. Its karyotype has 2n = 38–42, and it probably actually represents several distinct undescribed species.

References

Literature cited

Nectomys
Mammals described in 1861
Mammals of Bolivia
Mammals of Brazil
Mammals of Ecuador
Mammals of Peru
Taxa named by Wilhelm Peters